Plectronidium australiense is a species of anamorphic fungus. Known only from Australia, where it grows on the dead branches of Banksia canei, it was described as new to science in 1986. Its conidia have a basal appendage and measure 19–26 by 1.5 μm—shorter and narrower than the similar species P. minor,  P. sinense, or P. magnoliae.

References

External links

Fungi of Australia
Fungi described in 1986
Pezizomycotina